Mutt Mitt is a brand of plastic mitt used to pick up waste from pets, especially dogs. Mutt Mitt dispensers can be found in parks, apartment complexes, and condominiums throughout the United States.

About
Mutt Mitt plastic mitts are two-ply with a bottom pouch, and are constructed so that the user cannot get waste on their hands. They are also puncture-resistant and leave no mess when the mitt is turned inside out. They are discarded after waste has been picked up.

Mutt Mitts are single-use for non-commercial customers and come in packages of 300 and 500.

References

Dog equipment